Silence of Another Kind is the third studio album by the band Paatos.

Track listing

 "Shame" - (4:32)
 "Your Misery" - (5:06)
 "Falling" - (5:10)
 "Still Standing" - (6:10)
 "Is That All?" - (6:49)
 "Procession of Fools" - (0:34)
 "There Will Be No Miracles" - (3:36)
 "Not a Sound" - (7:25)
 "Silence of Another Kind" - (2:41)

2006 albums
Paatos albums
Inside Out Music albums